The éditions Phébus is a French publishing house established in 1976 by Jean-Pierre Sicre and taken over in 2003 by the .

Catalogue 
Phébus publishes a catalog of French and foreign literature that is both contemporary (Julie Otsuka, Elif Shafak, Hugo Hamilton, Jesús Greus, Joseph O'Connor, Elisabeth Crane, Karel Schoeman Françoise Cloarec, Annie Butor, Jeanne Cordelier, Marcel Lévy, Keith Ridgway, Angélique Villeneuve, Christian Chevassieux, Christophe Carlier, Gil Jouanard, David Boratav, Nathalie Peyrebonne, Martine Desjardin, Eric Plamondon, ... ) and classical (Wilkie Collins, Jack London, E. T. A. Hoffmann, Robert Margerit), with, historically, a predilection for travel stories (Longue Marche) by Bernard Ollivier, Vérification de la porte opposée by Sylvain Tesson), and testimonies (La Fin de ma Russie, Journal d'une jeune fille russe à Berlin).

History 
The economic situation of the Phébus editions has long been problematic. When they won the Prix des Libraires in 1985, the Éditions Phébus had a catalog of almost a hundred titles and gained some recognition from the public. In 2006, two years after the takeover of the house by the Libella group, the departure of the publisher Jean-Pierre Sicre shook Phébus. The foreign literature department directed by Daniel Arsand until October 2015 is now directed by Nils C. Ahl and the French literature one by Louis Chevaillier, former head of the Folio collection, who took over from Lionel Besnier. A new generation that hosts a catalog of fluent, incarnated and generous texts inspired by Blaise Cendrars in Rhum to young people of today who are tired of literature to prove to them that "A novel can also be an act".

Authors 

 Mathieu Terence
 Bernard Ollivier
 Christian Chevassieux
 Daniel Arsand
 Françoise Cloarec
 Gil Jouanard
 Roland Garros
 Sylvain Tesson 
 Cédric Gras
 E. T. A. Hoffmann
 Wilkie Collins
 Alexander Kent
 Julie Otsuka 
 Joseph O'Connor
 Oya Baydar
 Julie Otsuka
 Christian Kracht
 Elif Shafak
 Hugo Hamilton
 Keith Ridgway
 Karel Schoeman 
 Elizabeth Crane
 Anne Tyler
 Carsten Jensen
 Drago Jančar

References

External links 
 Official website

Publishing companies of France
Publishing companies established in 1976
French companies established in 1976